Ely College is a secondary academy school located in Ely, Cambridgeshire.

History 
In 1957  Ely High School for Girls  moved out of the centre of Ely to an extensive site on Downham Road.  St Audrey's Infant School was built nearby on the site around the same time. In 1969 a donation from the Catherine Needham Foundation, a local charitable trust set up in memory of Lady Catherine Needham, enabled the establishment of the Needham's County Secondary School adjacent to the High School. In September 1972 Ely High School and Needham's Secondary Modern School merged to become the City of Ely College as part of the change to comprehensive education in Ely. The College was located in the former Needham's building and a VIth Form College for pupils from the wider area (Ely, together with Soham, Littleport & Witchford Village Colleges) was established in the old Girls' High School building. Subsequently, they became the City of Ely Community College. In 2011 the school was renamed Ely College.

In September 2010, the College's governors adopted Foundation status, and in 2011, they applied to the Secretary of State to change to Academy status, proposing to join the CfBT Schools Trust, an Academies Trust formed by CfBT, one of the UK's leading educational charities. Ely College joined the Trust in January 2012, but then joined the CMAT group of schools in September 2016 instead.

CMAT and the House System
CMAT was formed in 2011. The Trust began as Cambridge Meridian Education Trust (CMET) in March 2009 to promote the new schools at Northstowe, a new town proposed between Swavesey and Cambridge. The trust started with Swavesey Village College. In March 2011 CMET became Cambridge Meridian Academies Trust (CMAT), a multi-academy trust, so that Swavesey Village College could convert to an academy and sponsor other academies.

Ely College is organised into five 'Houses', each of which consist of around 250 students, 12 tutor groups and 30 staff. Houses are responsible for monitoring and ensuring the welfare and progress of the students; each House has a distinct identity, but applies common structures and systems. They are named Etheldreda (after Saint Etheldreda), Scott (after explorer Scott of the Antarctic), Franklin (after famous scientist Rosalind Franklin), Turing (after mathematician Alan Turing) and Seacole (after Mary Seacole, the British-Jamaican nurse in the Crimean War). This house system is used in many of the CMAT academies.

Bishop Laney
Bishop Laney (named after Ely's Bishop who lived from 1590-1674), formerly Ely College Sixth Form, is a Sixth Form in Ely, sharing some of the property with Ely College. Also one of the CMAT schools as well as part of the Staploe Education Trust, it is an ongoing partnership between Ely College and Soham Village College.
The Sixth Form provides both traditional A-Level courses and Level 2 and 3 Technical Awards. It also works with Norwich City Football Club to provide a football course, which can be taken alongside other courses. The Sixth Form takes part in many activities with the College.

Zero tolerance controversy
In April 2011 the Daily Express dubbed Ely College "Britain's strictest school". In a newsletter to parents that month, Headteacher Catherine Jenkinson-Dix had issued a warning about the introduction of a zero-tolerance policy for the school, rigidly enforcing existing policies on school uniforms and discipline, plus restricting the use of mobile phones and iPods. Defending the action, she stated: "This is fundamental in preparing them for their future careers, where they certainly would not get away with being rude, dressing inappropriately and chewing gum."

The school came under scrutiny in the national press over detentions. The Daily Mirror reported that on one day, one-fifth of the schools pupils were put in detention for "a crackdown on school behaviour". Some parents were supportive and by the following month Catherine Jenkinson-Dix was claiming the policy to have been a success, saying that it had enabled teachers to spend more time teaching as they are dealing with fewer distractions in the classroom.

Ofsted reports 

In 2013, Ofsted rated Ely College as 'Good'.

In 2015, Ofsted rated Ely College as 'Inadequate' and requiring special measures. This can be backed up by former students of the college.

In 2019, Ofsted rated Ely College as ‘Good’ overall with ‘Outstanding’ effectiveness of leadership and management.

References

External links 
 Official School website
 Official CMAT website
 Official Sixth Form website

Academies in Cambridgeshire
Ely, Cambridgeshire
Educational institutions established in 1972
Secondary schools in Cambridgeshire